The Flyweight class in the boxing competition was the second-lowest weight class.  Flyweights were limited to those boxers weighing a maximum of 51 kilograms (112.4 lbs). 26 boxers qualified for this category. Like all Olympic boxing events, the competition was a straight single-elimination tournament. Both semifinal losers were awarded bronze medals, so no boxers competed again after their first loss. Bouts consisted of six rounds each. Five judges scored each bout.

Medalists

Schedule

Draw

1 Cintrón was ejected from the competition after officials discovered he was underage on the morning of the first round.

References

Boxing at the 1968 Summer Olympics